The 1995–96 season of the NOFV-Oberliga was the second season of the league at tier four (IV) of the German football league system after the reintroduction of the Fußball-Regionalliga. This was the first season in German football where the new 3-points-for-a-win rule was used.

The NOFV-Oberliga was split into two divisions, NOFV-Oberliga Nord and NOFV-Oberliga Süd. The champions of each, SCC Berlin and VFC Plauen, were directly promoted to the 1996–97 Regionalliga Nordost.

North

South

External links 
 NOFV-Online – official website of the North-East German Football Association 

NOFV-Oberliga seasons
4
Germ